In television programming, a limited-run series (or simply limited series) is a program with an end date and limit to the number of episodes. For instance, The Academy of Television Arts & Sciences' definition specifies a "program with two or more episodes with a total running time of at least 150 program minutes that tells a complete, non-recurring story, and does not have an on-going storyline and/or main characters in subsequent seasons." Limited-run series are represented in the form of telenovelas in Latin America and serials in the United Kingdom.

The shortest forms of limited-run series have two or three parts, usually described as "made-for-television film" or miniseries in the United States. Longer forms are often reality television or scripted dramas.

Parameters
Some limited series do not have main characters recurring between seasons or a storyline that spans seasons. Series with five episodes or fewer per season—such as the BBC/Masterpiece coproduction Sherlock—also are considered limited series due to their short run, even if main characters and story lines do migrate across seasons. Series with a limited eight-to-twelve episode run are typically ordered to fill mid-season television network gaps.

Classification
Limited series have the potential to be renewed without a required number of episodes as a typical order per season. Under the Dome, Killer Women, and Luther were originally marketed as limited series. Individual season-length stories of anthology series such as American Horror Story, Fargo, and True Detective are also described as "limited series", which the Primetime Emmys have changed to their miniseries/limited series category to accommodate.

Actors may choose to take part in limited-run series because their set start and end dates make scheduling other projects easier.

History
In 2015, the Academy of Television Arts & Sciences changed its guidelines on how Emmy nominees are classified, with shows with a limited run all referred to as "limited series" instead of "miniseries". This is a reversion back to 1974, when the category was named "outstanding limited series". It had been changed to "outstanding miniseries" in 1986 and then added to the "made for television films" category in 2011. Miniseries were brought back out in 2014, accommodating such limited series as HBO's Olive Kitteridge, History's Texas Rising, IFC's The Honorable Woman, and PBS' Wolf Hall, as well as TV movies such as HBO's Bessie and National Geographic's Killing Jesus.

Development

United States
Short-term reality television like Bravo's Eat, Drink, Love, scripted dramas like Netflix's Black Mirror, and individual seasons of anthology series are examples of limited-run series that appear on American television networks.

Latin America
In the 1950s, telenovelas emerged as Latin limited series. These low-budget Spanish and Portuguese shows were modeled after American soap operas in style and form. The programs follow a story arc that ends at the end of a season, with the possibility of renewal for subsequent seasons.

United Kingdom
In British television, the term "serial" or simply "series" is used instead of "miniseries". Like telenovelas, these programmes are stand-alone dramas, with a conclusion at the last episode of the series.

References

Television terminology